The GPV8 is a 3.5-litre and 3.8-litre, naturally-aspirated V8 engine, originally designed, developed and produced by Cosworth, for the Lotus T125 open-wheel sports car. The rev limit of the engine is 10,300 rpm; and can be temporarily raised to 10,800 rpm with a push-to-pass button feature.

Unlike formula cars, the engine has been manufactured for durability, longevity, and reliability, with the engine able to withstand more than
 on premium 98-octane pump gas.

Applications
Lotus T125

References

External links
FZED

Gasoline engines by model
Engines by model
Cosworth
V8 engines